Special Love is the second full-length gospel album by American R&B singer Deniece Williams, released in 1989. The album was distributed by both MCA Records (conventional record stores) and Sparrow Records (Christian bookstores). Williams was nominated for a Grammy Award for Best R&B Performance by a Duo or Group for the track "We Sing Praises" with R&B singer Natalie Cole at the 32nd Grammy Awards. The track "Every Moment" was serviced to both mainstream Contemporary R&B and CCM radio stations accompanied by a music video. Williams re-recorded the track "Healing" from her 1986 album Hot on the Trail for this album. Some North American CD editions of Special Love contained a bonus track of "Do You Hear What I Hear?", originally recorded for the 1988 Sparrow Records Christmas album, simply titled Christmas co-produced by Christian singer-songwriter Roby Duke. Williams' then-husband Brad Westering produced the album. Special Love peaked at number 11 on the Billboard Top Christian Albums chart.

Critical reception

In a review for the Chicago Tribune, Mitchell May rated the album three out of four stars. May wrote that Special Love avoids "excessive fanfare or overkill" and makes good use of Williams' "rich soprano" on every track. In the New York Daily News, Hugh Wyatt wrote that the album has "a refreshing absence of soap opera lyrics and other pop-music trash."

Track listings

Note: "Do You Hear What I Hear?" was produced by Brad Westering and Roby Duke; all other tracks produced by Westering.

Charts

Radio singles

References

1989 albums
Deniece Williams albums
Sparrow Records albums
MCA Records albums